The 3. Internationales ADAC 1000 Kilometer Rennen auf dem Nürburgring  took place on 26 May 1957, on the Nürburgring Nordschleife, (West Germany).  It was also the fourth round of the F.I.A. World Sports Car Championship. This would the first championship since the dreadful events in the Mille Miglia, Italy just a fortnight ago, where Alfonso de Portago crashed killing himself, his co-driver and nine spectators.

Report

Entry

A grand total 79 racing cars were registered for this event, of which 74 arrived for practice and qualifying. Fresh from their sad domination on the Mille Miglia, came two work teams of Scuderia Ferrari, and Officine Alfieri Maserati. The team from Maranello arrived with two cars, a Ferrari 335 S and a Ferrari 315 S. The former was to be driven by Peter Collins and Olivier Gendebien with the older car for Mike Hawthorn and Maurice Trintignant. In the Grand Touring class, one of the works driver, Wolfgang von Trips had an accident in the challenging Breidscheid section, following a change in a pedal layout in his Ferrari 250 GT. He was admitted to hospital with cuts and bruises and was unable to participate in the race.

Their Modenese rivals, who were just 2 points behind Ferrari going into the meeting, arrived with three cars, two 450Ss, plus a 300s. Their stars drivers, included Juan Manuel Fangio and Stirling Moss. With Porsche KG send two car to chase one of the less classes, it was left the semi-works Jaguar D-Types from Ecurie Ecosse and David Brown's Aston Martin DBR1/300 to challenge the Italian marques.

Qualifying

Qualifying was held over three sessions for a total of 1,590 minutes over the three days prior to the race. The Maserati 450S of Fangio took pole position, averaging a speed of 87.446 mph around the 14.173 mile circuit. The '53 and '56 pole winner was on pole yet again, having given everyone a lesson on how to drive the 174 corners of the 'Ring. When the session had finished, Maserati had secured the first two places. The Aston Martin of Tony Brooks, secured third ahead of the Scuderia Ferraris.

Race

The day of the race would be warm and dry, but windy, with a crowd of approximately 120,000 in attendance. Although the Maserati 450S's had been expected to dominate, Brooks led from the start until passed by Moss after 8 laps who then led until on the 10th lap his 450S lost a rear wheel. The team then switched both Moss and Fangio into Harry Schell's car, leaving Hans Herrmann without a drive, but this car had an oil leak which caused it to make a premature stop and retire by lap 19. Francisco Godia-Sales then offered his older 300S to the works team, who placed both Moss and Fangio in the car and with him and his regular co-driver Horace Gould brought the car home in fifth place, securing Maserati two championship points.

As for victory in the race, this did not go to Scuderia Ferrari, as they were beaten by more than four minutes by the Aston Martin DBR1/300 of Brooks and Noël Cunningham-Reid who gained the marque their first points of the season and their first World Championship victory since the Tourist Trophy of 1953. The partnership, won in a time of 7hr 33:38.2 mins., averaging a speed of 82.485mph. The margin of triumph over the Ferrari of Collins/Gendebien was 4 min 13.7s, who were followed home by their team-mates Hawthorn/Trintignant who were a further 1 min 35.3s adrift. Porsche snatched fourth place with Umberto Maglioli/Edgar Barth, but their 550A RS finished almost 17 minutes adrift of the winners. The Aston's pace was so quick that it lapped even the fifth placed Maserati 300S of Moss/Fangio/Godia-Sales/Gould. The race did not end when Brooks crossed the finishing line, but continued for another hour to allow the other classes/division to try and complete the full 1000 km.

Official Classification

Class Winners are in Bold text.

 Fastest Lap: Stirling Moss, 9:49.9secs (86.497 mph)

Class Winners

Standings after the race

Note: Only the top five positions are included in this set of standings.Championship points were awarded for the first six places in each race in the order of 8-6-4-3-2-1. Manufacturers were only awarded points for their highest finishing car with no points awarded for positions filled by additional cars. Only the best 4 results out of the 6 races could be retained by each manufacturer. Points earned but not counted towards the championship totals are listed within brackets in the above table.

References

Nurburgring
6 Hours of Nürburgring
Nurburgring